Bevin Fortuin (born 6 February 1979) is a former South African international rugby union player and currently the head coach of the . His regular playing position was fullback or centre.

Career

Provincial
He started playing for local side , playing for them at youth level from 1998 until he made his senior debut in 2000.

In early 2011, he announced that he would be a candidate for the Democratic Alliance in the South African municipal election, 2011. The SWD Rugby Union distanced themselves from him and he was not offered a contract for 2012.

International

He made his debut for South Africa against  in 2006. In 2007, he was included in the South African team for the 2007 Tri Nations tournament, where he played in one match against .

Coaching
He joined club side Blanco instead for 2011, first as a player, but later as their coach, guiding them to the 2012 National Club Championships. He joined the  coaching staff for the 2012 season and was appointed head coach after the 2013 Vodacom Cup season.

References

South African rugby union coaches
South African rugby union players
South Africa international rugby union players
Living people
1979 births
People from George, South Africa
Rugby union players from the Western Cape
Rugby union centres
Rugby union fullbacks
Cheetahs (rugby union) players